In mathematics, quasisymmetric may refer to 
Quasisymmetric functions in algebraic combinatorics
Quasisymmetric maps in complex analysis or metric spaces. 
Quasi-symmetric designs in combinatorial design theory.